Regina Maria Loureiro Barreto Casé OMC (born 25 February 1954) is a Brazilian actress, screenwriter, director, producer, and television presenter.

Career
In 1974, Casé, together with Hamilton Vaz Pereira, Jorge Alberto Soares, Luiz Arthur Peixoto e Daniel Dantas, founded a theater company called Asdrúbal Trouxe o Trombone ("Asdrúbal brought the trombone") in Rio de Janeiro.  The group was influential in the cultural scene of Rio in the late 1970s.  The group's debut production was an adaptation of The Inspector General by Nikolai Gogol.  For her performance in that production, Casé won the Governor's Prize for breakout actress.  Another important production was Trate-me Leão in 1977, which won the Molière Prize.

Casé also began appearing in films in the 1970s, including Chuvas de Verão ("Summer Rains") (1978) directed by Cacá Diegues.  Her film career included some of the classics of Brazilian cinema in the 1980s, including Eu Te Amo ("I Love You") (1981) by Arnaldo Jabor, Os Sete Gatinhos ("The Seven Kittens") (1980) by Neville de Almeida, O Segredo da Múmia ("The Mummy's Secret") (1982) by Ivan Cardoso, and A Marvada Carne (1985) by André Klotzel. Other film work in the 1980s included Cinema Falado ("Spoken Cinema") (1986) by Caetano Veloso; O Grande Mentecapto ("The Big Lunatic") (1989) by Oswaldo Caldeira; and Eu, Tu, Eles ("Me, You, Them") (2001), by Andrucha Waddington. She also appeared in the American film, Moon Over Parador ("Luar sobre Parador") (1988) by Paul Mazursky.

In 1983, Casé made her television debut on the Globo network telenovela Guerra dos Sexos ("War of the Sexes") by Sílvio de Abreu.  In that same year she was also appearing in the children's program Sítio do Pica Pau Amarelo ("Yellow Woodpecker Farm"), at that time directed by her father, Geraldo Casé.  In 1984, she joined the cast of Vereda Tropical ("Tropical sidewalk") by Carlos Lombardi, and appeared in the children's program Plunct, Plact, Zuuum II.

She gained notoriety in the group Asdrúbal Trouxe o Trombone and in the sitcom TV Pirata. In the 1990s she presented the TV shows Programa Legal, Brasil Legal and Muvuca on Rede Globo. Nowadays she's on Futura channel and in Central da Periferia on Rede Globo, firstly a sketch at Fantástico.
 
In 2016, she appeared in the Olympic games opening ceremonies as part of a showcase of Brazilian pop culture.

Filmography

Television

 As director/roteirista

Film

Videography

References

Brazilian television presenters
Brazilian actresses
1954 births
Living people
Brazilian women comedians
People from Rio de Janeiro (city)
Brazilian women television presenters